The Law of Peoples is American philosopher John Rawls' work on international relations. First published in 1993 as a short article (1993: Critical Inquiry, no.20), in 1999 it was expanded and joined with another essay, "The Idea of Public Reason Revisited" to form a full-length book. Rawls's basic distinction in international politics is that his preferred emphasis on a society of peoples is separate from the more conventional discussion of international politics as based upon relationships between states. It is an attempt to show "how the content of a Law of Peoples might be developed out of a liberal idea of justice similar to, but more general than, the idea I call justice as fairness" (L.P. p. 3).

The Society of Peoples 

By 'peoples', Rawls means "the actors in the Society of Peoples, just as citizens are the actors in domestic society" (L.P. p. 23). Peoples share three features: a common system of government; what John Stuart Mill called 'common sympathies' (XVI of Mill's Considerations, 1862); and a moral nature.  Although the Law of Peoples is supposed to be part of liberal foreign policy, the peoples Rawls talks about are not necessarily liberal.  'Decent hierarchical peoples' also feature as parties to the Law of Peoples, though 'burdened societies', 'outlaw states' and 'benevolent absolutisms' do not.  The inclusion of 'decent hierarchical peoples' is demanded by the notion of toleration, a notion Rawls sees as integral to liberalism.  In part, the Law of Peoples is an attempt to show how far international toleration by liberal societies can reasonably be expected to extend.

By 'Law of Peoples', Rawls means "a particular political conception of right and justice that applies to the principles and norms of international law and practice" (L.P. p. 3).  This political conception of justice is arrived at through the device of the 'original position' – a hypothetical arrangement whereby representatives of each of the peoples get together with the aim of determining principles that will govern the terms of their association.  The principles yielded by this process make up the content of the Law of Peoples.  The eight principles are:

"Peoples (as organized by their government) are free and independent, and their freedom and independence is to be respected by other peoples."
"Peoples are equal and parties to their own agreements."
"Peoples have the right of self-defense but no right to war."
"Peoples are to observe a duty of non-intervention."
"Peoples are to observe treaties and undertakings."
"Peoples are to observe certain specified restrictions on the conduct of war (assumed to be in self-defense)."
"Peoples are to honor human rights."
"Peoples have a duty to assist other peoples living under unfavorable conditions that prevent their having a just or decent political and social regime."

Ideal vs Non-Ideal Theory
The content-giving part of Rawls' thesis belongs to Ideal Theory, it is an attempt to define how different peoples who are just, or at least decent, should behave with respect to one another. Rawls refers to this ideal conception as a "realistic utopia": realistic because it could and may exist; utopian because it "joins reasonableness and justice with conditions enabling citizens to realize their fundamental interests" (L.P. p. 7).  This is a continuation of Jean-Jacques Rousseau’s idea that any attempt to discover sure principles of government must take "men as they are and laws as they might be" (The Social Contract; opening passage).  Thus, the Law of Peoples is realistically utopian: it is an attempt to show "how reasonable citizens and peoples might live peacefully in a just world" (L.P., Preface, p.vi).

It is typical of Rawls' approach that he focuses on ideal theory and does not discuss to any great extent non-ideal theory, which involves considering the proper response to injustice. However, in dealing with international relations the questions arising from the highly nonideal conditions of the real world with its great injustices and widespread social evils cannot be put aside. Thus Rawls considers how a "well ordered" people (liberal or decent) should behave towards outlaw or burdened societies that cannot be considered decent.

Criticisms 
It has been argued that cosmopolitan interpretation of John Rawls‘ theory of justice as fairness is a more reasonable alternative to the application of The Law of Peoples at the global level. According to this view, an arbitrary limitation of the scope of applicability of justice as fairness is embodied in the specification of the conception of the person as a citizen and of society as a constitutional liberal democratic nation-state. Moreover, it is argued that the conception of toleration, on which these specifications of fundamental ideas into particular conceptions ultimately rely, is disanalogous between the domestic and international context and incompatible with the foundational commitments of a political theory of justice in The Law of Peoples.

Notes

John Rawls, "The Law of Peoples," Critical Inquiry, Vol. 20, No. 1. (Autumn, 1993), pp. 36–68.
https://web.archive.org/web/20050212225311/http://www.english.iup.edu/mhayward/Recent/Rawls.htm

References

1999 non-fiction books
American non-fiction books
Books about international relations
English-language books
Philosophy books
Works by John Rawls